The 2002 Shanghai International Film Festival (SIFF) was the 6th SIFF to be held and the second festival to be held on an annual basis. The festival was held between June 8 and June 16, 2002.

Jury
 President: Li Quankuan (China) - director
 François Girard (Canada) - director
 Geoffrey Gilmore (America) - director
 Hur Jin-ho (South Korea) - director
 Jacek Bromski (Poland) - director
 Sergei Solovyov (Russia) - director
 Thorfinnur Omarsson (Iceland) - film critic
 Han Sanping (China) - producer
 Huang Shuqin (China) - director

In competition

Awards

Golden Goblet
Best Film - Life Show (China)
Best Actor - Colin Farrel for Hart's War
Best Actress - Tao Hong for Life Show
Best Cinematography - Sun Ming for Life Show
Best Music - Takeshi Kobayahi for All About Lily Chou-Chou
Best Director - David Caesar for Mullet
Best Screenplay - Ju Kyung-Jung for A Little Monk

Special Jury Award
All About Lily Chou-Chou

External links
Archives of the Shanghai International Film Festival
6th SIFF at the Internet Movie Database

Shanghai
Shanghai
Shanghai International Film Festival, 2002
Shanghai International Film Festival
21st century in Shanghai